Abacetus flavipes is a species of ground beetle in the subfamily Pterostichinae. It was described by C.G.Thomson in 1858.

References

flavipes
Beetles described in 1858